Club Air was an airline based in Verona, Italy operating domestic flights within Italy and international flights to Albania, France, Moldova, Kosovo, Romania and Ukraine. It had a hub at Verona Airport.

History 

The airline was originally established in October 2002 with its first flights the next month.
The Italian civil aviation authority, ENAC, withdrew the airlines operating certificate on 12 December 2006.
Services resumed under new owners and new management on May 2, 2007.
This new venture was unsuccessful with operations ceasing in May 2008.

Destinations 

The airline offered a combination of domestic services and services to Eastern Europe, trying to take advantage of migrant workers travelling to and from their countries of origin.
Routes included those from Verona to Bucharest, Timișoara Bacău, Cluj-Napoca (Romania), Chişinău (Moldova), Pristina (Kosovo) Lviv (Ukraine) .

Fleet

See also
 List of defunct airlines of Italy

References

External links

Route map and statistical information

Italian companies established in 2002
Italian companies disestablished in 2008
Defunct airlines of Italy
Airlines established in 2002
Airlines disestablished in 2008